The Taipei Economic and Cultural Center in Chennai represents the interests of Taiwan in the southern states and territories of India, functioning as a de facto consulate in the absence of diplomatic relations. It was established in 2012.
It is headed by a Representative, currently Tien Chung-kwang.

The Center is also responsible for relations with Sri Lanka and the Maldives.

There is also a Taipei Economic and Cultural Center in India in New Delhi. This is responsible for relations with Nepal and Bhutan, and has joint responsibility for Bangladesh with the Taipei Economic and Cultural Office in Thailand in Bangkok.

Its counterpart body in Taiwan is the India-Taipei Association in Taipei.

See also
 India–Taiwan relations
 Taipei Economic and Cultural Center in India
 Foreign relations of Taiwan
 List of diplomatic missions of Taiwan

References

 

Diplomatic missions in India
India–Taiwan_relations
Chennai
Taiwan
2012 establishments in Tamil Nadu
Organizations established in 2012